Centriolin is a protein that in humans is encoded by the CNTRL gene. It was previously known as CEP110.

This gene encodes a centrosomal protein required for the centrosome to function as a microtubule organizing center. The gene product is also associated with centrosome maturation. One version of stem cell myeloproliferative disorder is the result of a reciprocal translocation between chromosomes 8 and 9, with the breakpoint associated with fibroblast growth factor receptor 1 and centriolin.

References

External links

Further reading

Centrosome